The tour by the English cricket team in South Africa in 1909–10 was organised by Marylebone Cricket Club (MCC).  The team played as MCC in the non-Test fixtures and as England in the five Test matches.  They played 14 first-class matches including the Tests, winning 7 times with 3 draws and 4 defeats.

England was captained by H. D. G. Leveson Gower.  South Africa's captain in the Test series was Tip Snooke.

Test series summary
South Africa won the Test series 3–2.

Match length: 5 days (excluding Sundays). Balls per over: 6.

First Test

Second Test

Third Test

Fourth Test

Fifth Test

The Reef v MCC
The tour included The Reef v MCC at Boksburg.  It was scheduled as a four-day match but play only took place on two because of bad weather.  Although the two teams consisted of recognised players, the South African Board of Control decided as late as 1930 that it had not been a first-class match.  Wisden 1931 reproduced a letter from the SABC which outlined its case.  Wisden has ignored the ruling and includes the match in the career figures of all the players who took part, including record-breaking players such as Wilfred Rhodes, Jack Hobbs and Frank Woolley.

It is possible that the SABC thought it was a 2-day match, but Wisden 1911 clearly states that "not a ball could be bowled on the first and fourth days" so it was actually planned as a 4-day match.

For more information about this curious affair, see: Variations in First-Class Cricket Statistics.

References

External links
 Wisden Online 1911

Annual reviews
 Wisden Cricketers' Almanack 1911

Further reading
 Bill Frindall, The Wisden Book of Test Cricket 1877-1978, Wisden, 1979

1910 in English cricket
1910 in South African cricket
International cricket competitions from 1888–89 to 1918
1909-10
South African cricket seasons from 1888–89 to 1917–18